The 1983 PBA All-Filipino Conference Finals was the best-of-5 basketball championship series of the 1983 PBA All-Filipino Conference, and the conclusion of the conference playoffs.

The Crispa Redmanizers scored a 3–0 sweep in their finals series against Gilbey's Gin to complete a 12-game winning streak and retains the All-Filipino crown.

Qualification

Games summary

Game 1

Game 2

Game 3

Rosters

Broadcast notes

References

Crispa Redmanizers games
Barangay Ginebra San Miguel games
1983
1983 PBA season
PBA All-Filipino Conference Finals